Gwyneth Kutz is a Canadian ambassador responsible for opening and heading Canada's first diplomatic presence in Tirana, Albania in 1999 and was Canada's first resident Ambassador to El Salvador (2004-2006).  She was also Ambassador to Argentina and Paraguay (2010-2015) and Ambassador to Peru and Bolivia (announced August 2015). Kutz was replaced as Ambassador to Peru and Bolivia by Ralph Jansen in 2019.

Kutz graduated from the University of Calgary (General Humanities 1987).

References

Canadian women ambassadors
Ambassadors of Canada to El Salvador
Ambassadors of Canada to Argentina
Ambassadors of Canada to Paraguay
Ambassadors of Canada to Peru
Ambassadors of Canada to Bolivia
University of Calgary alumni
Year of birth missing (living people)
Living people